A statue of John A. Macdonald by Mike Halterman was installed near the gateway of Victoria Row in Charlottetown, Prince Edward Island, until 2021.  It was removed as a result of Macdonald's involvement with the Indian residential school system.

References

Buildings and structures in Charlottetown
John A. Macdonald
Sculptures of men in Canada
Statues in Canada
Relocated buildings and structures in Canada
Statues removed in 2021